The 2013 History 300 was the tenth stock car race of the 2013 NASCAR Nationwide Series and the 32nd iteration of the event. The race was held on Saturday, May 25, 2013, in Concord, North Carolina at Charlotte Motor Speedway, a 1.5 miles (2.4 km) permanent quad-oval. The race took the scheduled 200 laps to complete. At race's end, Kyle Busch, driving for Joe Gibbs Racing, would dominate the race to win his 57th career NASCAR Nationwide Series win, his sixth of the season, and his second consecutive win. To fill out the podium, Kasey Kahne of JR Motorsports and Joey Logano of Penske Racing would finish second and third, respectively.

Background 

The race was held at Charlotte Motor Speedway, located in Concord, North Carolina. The speedway complex includes a 1.5-mile (2.4 km) quad-oval track that was utilized for the race, as well as a dragstrip and a dirt track. The speedway was built in 1959 by Bruton Smith and is considered the home track for NASCAR with many race teams based in the Charlotte metropolitan area. The track is owned and operated by Speedway Motorsports Inc. (SMI) with Marcus G. Smith serving as track president.

Entry list

Practice

First practice/Open Test 
The first practice, a four-hour test session, was held on Wednesday, May 22, at 12:00 PM EST.

Second practice 
The second practice session was held on Thursday, May 23, at 1:00 PM EST, and would last for two hours and 20 minutes.

Third and final practice 
The third and final practice, sometimes known as Happy Hour, was held on Thursday, May 23, at 5:10 PM EST, and would last for one hour and 20 minutes.

Qualifying 
Qualifying was held on Saturday, May 25, at 11:05 AM EST. Each driver would have two laps to set a fastest time; the fastest of the two would count as their official qualifying lap.

Four drivers would fail to qualify: J. J. Yeley, Bryan Silas, Matt DiBenedetto, and Tanner Berryhill.

Full qualifying results

Race results

References 

2013 NASCAR Nationwide Series
NASCAR races at Charlotte Motor Speedway
May 2013 sports events in the United States
2013 in sports in North Carolina